Datuk Mohamed Noor bin Shamsuddin (born 1 March 1967), known professionally as Rosyam Nor, is a Malaysian actor, television host and film producer.

Early career
He first ventured into acting in Gila-Gila Remaja, a 1985 film about youngsters in Malaysia alongside his cousin, Faizal Hussein as the lead role. After acting in several films, he got his first leading role through Suami, Isteri, dan... in 1996. He is known for his versatility in acting and has since then garnered many awards in Malaysia's film industry.

Personal life
Rosyam married Runika Mohd Yusoff in 1989 and has five daughters. He became a grandfather in 2014.

His father, Shamsuddin Mohd Yusof died on January 26, 2008, due to kidney failure and pneumonia.

Filmography

Feature films

Television

Television series

Telemovie

Awards and nominations

Asia Pacific Film Festival
 Best Supporting Actor for Lenjan (1999)
 Best Actor for Bilut (2006)

Malaysia Film Festival
 Best Supporting Actor (Festival Filem Malaysia ke-14)
 Best Actor (Festival Filem Malaysia ke-16)
 Best Supporting Actor (Festival Filem Malaysia ke-17)
 Best Actor (Festival Filem Malaysia ke-21)
 Best Supporting Actor (Festival Filem Malaysia ke-26)

Anugerah Skrin
 Best Supporting Actor (Anugerah Skrin 1999)
 Best Actor (Anugerah Skrin 2003)
 Best Supporting Actor (Anugerah Skrin 2004)
 Best Actor (Anugerah Skrin 2008)

Anugerah Bintang Popular Berita Harian
 Most Popular Film Actor (Anugerah Bintang Popular Berita Harian 1997/98)
 Most Popular Film Actor (Anugerah Bintang Popular Berita Harian 1998/99)
 Most Popular TV Actor (Anugerah Bintang Popular Berita Harian 2002)
 Most Popular Film Actor (Anugerah Bintang Popular Berita Harian 2002) 
 Most Popular Artiste (Anugerah Bintang Popular Berita Harian 2002)
 Most Popular Film Actor (Anugerah Bintang Popular Berita Harian 2003)
 Most Popular TV Actor (Anugerah Bintang Popular Berita Harian 2005)
 Most Popular TV Actor (Anugerah Bintang Popular Berita Harian 2006)
 Most Popular TV Actor (Anugerah Bintang Popular Berita Harian 2007)
 Most Popular TV Actor (Anugerah Bintang Popular Berita Harian 2008)
 Most Popular TV Actor (Anugerah Bintang Popular Berita Harian 2009)

Anugerah Seri Angkasa
 Best TV Actor (Anugerah Sri Angkasa 2000)

Controversies
In 2017, Rosyam was criticized and blamed for failing to carry out as moderator task fairly and efficiently at the Transformasi Nasional 2050 (TN50) dialogue session for the entertainment industry with Najib Razak at the prime minister's official residence at Putrajaya which saw him mishandling a scuffle between film producer David Teo and comedian Sulaiman Yassin, better known as "Mat Over". Rosyam amid being embarrassed and had to apologise personally to Najib, remained boastful of his own credibility by claiming that Najib was fond of himself as the event emcee.

After the downfall of Najib Razak and Barisan Nasional (BN) in the 2018 general election, a boycott was called in the social media towards newly opened supermarket on 1 June, ST Rosyam Mart in Setiawangsa, Kuala Lumpur, said to be owned by Rosyam who was widely known as a supporter of the disgraced ex-prime minister. But in January 2019, allegations that Rosyam has never fully own and he is just an ambassador of the supermarket started to be viral in the social media. He was slammed for becoming the "barua Cina" or Chinese stooge made use by the Sri Ternak Group's Ho Ah Chai, the real owner of the supermarket to attract and deceive its customers. Only a month later after the viral accusation, he finally and publicly admits he is just a minority shareholder owning merely 10 per cent shares in the ST Rosyam Mart supermarket.

Rosyam was again embroiled in political polemic of both divides where his dignity and even business ventures were in questions when a visit was arranged for the new Pakatan Harapan (PH) government Minister of Agriculture and Agro-based Industry, Salahuddin Ayub ahead of an official event to the jackfruit farm and fish pond owned by him in Lanchang, Pahang on 16 April 2019.

Honours

Honours of Malaysia
 
  Companion Class II of the Exalted Order of Malacca (DPSM) - Datuk

References

External links

 

1967 births
Living people
People from Kuala Lumpur
Malaysian people of Malay descent
Malaysian Muslims
Malaysian television personalities
Malaysian male actors
Malaysian male voice actors
Malaysian actor-politicians
United Malays National Organisation politicians
21st-century Malaysian people